Bora Körk (born 9 June 1980 in Turkey) is a Turkish former footballer who played as a goalkeeper.

Professional career
On 10 May 2018, Bora helped Akhisar Belediyespor win their first professional trophy, the 2017–18 Turkish Cup.

Honours
Akhisarspor
 Turkish Cup (1): 2017-18

References

External links
TFF Profile
 
 Guardian Football Stats

1980 births
Living people
Footballers from İzmir
Turkish footballers
Akhisarspor footballers
MKE Ankaragücü footballers
Malatyaspor footballers
Kardemir Karabükspor footballers
Association football goalkeepers
Süper Lig players
TFF First League players